Connections & Disconnections is an album recorded by Fuzzy Haskins, Calvin Simon, and Grady Thomas under the name Funkadelic. 

With the history of financial disputes with Clinton behind them, and backing from Westbound Records founder Armen Boladian, this album (co-produced by former Sly and the Family Stone drummer Greg Errico, without the involvement of George Clinton) was released in Germany in 1980 entitled 42.9%, and in the United States in 1981 entitled Connections & Disconnections. It was reissued by Rhino Records in 1992 with the title Who's a Funkadelic? The competing release challenged George Clinton's claim to ownership of the "Funkadelic" name, ultimately leading to a lawsuit between the trio and Clinton.

Significance 
Due to the combination of several factors, by the end of the 1970s, the Parliament-Funkadelic enterprise was starting to crumble. Dissatisfaction with George Clinton's style of financial management led to the departure of additional key members Bernie Worrell, "Billy Bass" Nelson, Glenn Goins and Jerome Brailey. Haskins, Simon, and Thomas (along with Clinton and bass vocalist Ray Davis) had been members of The Parliaments since the band's inception in the mid-1950s. Throughout the 1960s and into the 1970s, they (Haskins, Simon, and Thomas) felt increasingly marginalized by the influx of new P-Funk musicians, and in 1977, refused to sign a Backstage Management contract requiring them to relinquish all rights to the names Parliament and Funkadelic. Shortly after the trio left Parliament-Funkadelic, they formed their own band, which they also named "Funkadelic," and recorded Connections & Disconnections. Their use of the name Funkadelic resulted in an acrimonious legal dispute with Clinton's organization, and is rumored to have contributed to accelerating the disintegration of Parliament-Funkadelic.

Track listing 
 "Phunklords" (Haskins, Mims, Simon, Thomas, Powers) – 	5:35
 "You'll Like It Too" (Haskins, Simon, Thomas, Williams, McEvoy) – 4:29
 "The Witch" (Haskins, Jackson, Simon, Thomas, Drake) – 9:31
 "Connections and Disconnections" (Geter, Haskins, Mims, Simon, Thomas) – 5:02 (released as a single LAX WS8 70055)
 "Come Back" (Haskins, Simon, Thomas, Mims, Powers) – 4:32
 "Call the Doctor" (Drake, Haskins, Mims, Simon, Thomas) – 5:14
 "Who's a Funkadelic" (Haskins, Mims, Simon, Thomas) – 	5:47

Personnel 
 Fuzzy Haskins - vocals & percussion
 Calvin Simon - vocals & percussion
 Grady Thomas - vocals & percussion
 Michael Williams - keyboards, guitar & vocals
 Billy Mims - clavinet, guitar, vocals
 Ben Powers Jr - drums, bass & vocals
 John Quad Wiley - keyboards & vocals
 Stan Thorn - keyboards
 Ken Blackmon - bass
 Thomas "Pae-dog" McEvoy - jazz horn
 Dede Dickerson - background musician
 Ngoh Spencer - background musician
 Vicky Randal - background musician
 Betty Jo Drake - background vocals

References

External links 
 Connections & Disconnections at Discogs

Funkadelic albums
1981 albums